Vagurampatty village panchayat is located 5 km from Namakkal town. After recent urbanisation, Namakkal town has extended up to Vagurampatty.

Geography 
Vagurampatty is surrounded by Vasanthapuram in the east, Siddhar malai karadu in the west, Lathuvadi in the south and Kondichettipatty, Namakkal in the north. Vagurampatty railway bridge is located in Vagurampatty and opened for public use in 2012. The bridge is located in the west side of the village and connects to the Mohanur Road.

Schools and colleges 
Govt Middle School, Vagurampatty  
Trinity Academy Matriculation Higher Secondary School   
Trinity College for Women, Namakkal     
Jai vikas Higher Secondary School
National public school

Villages in Namakkal district